Brigadier Sir Hubert James Marlowe Flaxman, CMG (22 July 1893 – 23 June 1976) was a British colonial administrator and judge.

Biography 
Flaxman was born on 22 July 1893, the son of James and Florence Flaxman. He was educated at Drapers' Schools, Purley and in St Gall in Switzerland.

He served in the British Army during the First World War from 1914 to 1921. He became a political officer in Mesopotamia in 1918. He then joined Sudan Civil Service in 1924, first as District Commissioner; then as District Judge in 1926 and Judge of the High Court in 1933. He was called to the English bar at the Middle Temple in 1934.

In 1940 he was appointed Chief Justice of the Sudan, serving until 1944. He then served with the British Army from 1944 to 1949, reaching the rank of Brigadier, and was mentioned in despatches. In 1949 he became the  British Judge on the Joint Court in the New Hebrides. From 1950 to 1955 he was Resident Commissioners of the New Hebrides. He was acting Attorney-General of Gibraltar from October to December 1955, when he was appointed Chief Justice of Gibraltar. He retired in September 1965.

Flaxman was appointed to the Egyptian Order of the Nile (4th Class) in 1934, a CMG in 1954. He was knighted in 1962.

Family 
Flaxman Muriel Kathleen Bateman (died 1961); they had a son. He then married secondly in 1961, Vivien Aderna Barton; she died in 2016.

References 

 The Times, 26 June 1976
 Who's Who

1893 births
1976 deaths
Knights Bachelor
British Army brigadiers
British Army personnel of World War I
British Army personnel of World War II
British colonial governors and administrators in Europe
British colonial governors and administrators in Oceania
Attorneys-General of Gibraltar
Resident Commissioners of the New Hebrides (United Kingdom)
British expatriate judges
Chief justices of Gibraltar
Members of the Middle Temple
British expatriates in Sudan
Companions of the Order of St Michael and St George
20th-century Gibraltarian judges
British expatriates in Iraq